Chrysodeixis dinawa is a moth of the family Noctuidae. It is found in New Guinea.

External links
Chrysodeixis at funet
Papua insects

Plusiinae
Moths described in 1906